Samuel or Sam Jacobs may refer to:

Sam Jacobs (bishop) (born 1938), American prelate of the Roman Catholic Church 
Sam Jacobs (footballer) (born 1988), Australian rules footballer
Sam Jacobs (judge) (1920–2011), Justice of the Supreme Court of South Australia

Samuel Joshua Jacobs (1853–1937), South Australian lawyer, businessman and sportsman
Sam Boardman-Jacobs (born 1942), Welsh playwright and director 
Samuel William Jacobs (1871–1938), Canadian lawyer and politician